Sofia Domeij (born 22 October 1976, in Hudiksvall) is a Swedish former biathlete. She has a Master of Science degree in technical chemistry. On September 2, 2011, Domeij officially retired due to injuries.

References 

Domeij retires (Swedish)

External links 
 Sofia Domeij's homepage

Swedish female biathletes
1976 births
Living people
Olympic biathletes of Sweden
Biathletes at the 2010 Winter Olympics